Victor Joseph Prévost (December 11, 1836 – January 19, 1880), also known as The La Chapelle Butcher and The Handsome Man, was a French former butcher, cuirassier, cent-gardes, policeman, murderer and possible serial killer. He killed at least two victims, and tried to hide his crimes by decapitating his victims. Because of Prévost's profession as a policeman in his neighborhood where he committed his crimes, his military past in a renowned elite corps and what he did with the victims' bodies, his case caused a great impact on the contemporary public: "Since the Abadie trial, no criminal case had interested the French public as much."

Biography

Youth and apprenticeship 
Victor Joseph Prévost was born in Mormant, Seine-et-Marne, France on December 11, 1836. His father, Pierre, was a coachman, and his mother, Barbe (née Griette), was unemployed. He had two older brothers: Leon and Adolphe, four and two years older respectively. From birth, Prévost was afflicted with bulimia, particularly inherited from his father, which remained with him for the rest of his life.

At the age of 14, Prévost's parents placed him as an apprentice at a trellis manufacturer on Rue Saint-Jacques in Paris. Although surrounded by young girls at an early age, young Prévost was treated harshly, sleeping on a bed without a mattress and had to work as much as an adult. Prévost's boss brutalized him and, to punish him for his bulimia, which he mistook for simple greed, reduced his daily food portions. Then, hungry, Prévost stole a piece of bread, but was caught and punished by being struck with a whip reserved for the dog. That same evening, while Prévost helped his employer to put up fences over a small yard, he made it swing through a frame whose piece of glass plowed his hands and face. From that moment, Prévost had only one idea in mind: to escape his ordeal.

Prévost was naturally kind and considerate. While in the Jardin du Luxembourg, he saw a large boy steal a toy accordion from a smaller one, which he managed to get back and return to the child. Aware of his strength, Prévost never hesitated to help the many push carriages that had difficulties in climbing the steep slope of the Rue de la Montagne-Sainte-Geneviève. One day, while running an errand for his boss, Prévost saw the cart of a milkman hit a boy of his age carrying a rack full of meat. While the milkman ran away, Prévost helped the young victim get up and, finding that the boy was no longer in shape to resume his service, he loaded the heavy piece of meat on his head effortlessly and then delivered it to its recipient, a butcher holding a shop on Rue Mouffetard. This incident gave him the idea of his Herculean strength while he was still a teenager.

There are different versions of what happened next. According to Ernest Raynaud, Prévost was suddenly taken with a passion for the bloody universe he discovered then: the clerks were cutting up the animals that had just been slaughtered and it was a debauchery of cut flesh and blood. Prévost was fascinated and couldn't help himself but participate in the carnage: he took a knife and, although a novice, cut off a shred of veal. According to Gustave Macé, things happened in a simpler manner: the delivery brought by Prévost to the butcher had come from consumption-stricken cows, which were prohibited from sale and would have landed Prévost in trouble if he was caught by police. Whichever case might be, the butcher was delighted when young Prévost asked him for a job. Soon after, his employer and the butcher had a meeting and agreed to exchange apprentices.

The following day, Prévost began his apprenticeship as a butcher. In the butcher shop, masters and clerks alike had huge appetites, regularly eating meat and bread, drinking wine and even liquors, which were also available at their discretion, which was perfect for Prévost's ogre appetite. The task was tough, as the apprentices had to transfer heavy loads between Les Halles or private slaughterhouses and retailers, sometimes over long distances, but Prévost did not lack the strength. He quickly learned how to butcher animals, and became an expert in skinning and deboning. He loved the smell of blood, and seemed to experience a real pleasure to handle meat. In the shop, he spoke Louchébem and behaved rather freely, with the cashier (a mistress of the boss) and one of the female servants quickly becoming attracted to the handsome apprentice. Violent jealousies soon followed, resulting in Prévost's dismissal. Shortly after, he found work in a school on Rue Saint-Honoré. As soon as he arrived, he again began to be swarmed by female attention, which earned him the nickname "The Handsome Man" among his colleagues. In fact, it is rather him who succumbed to the domestic workers' advances, that he did nothing to provoke.

Cuirassier and cent-garde 

Prévost was enlisted as a conscript for a 6-year military service on April 11, 1855, replacing his older brother. Being of large stature and burly, he was incorporated into the 4th Cuirassiers regiment before moving on October 14, 1856 to the 2nd Cuirassier Regiment of the Imperial Guard and the 12th Cuirassier Regiment, with whom he participated in the Italian campaign, for which he received the commemorative medal. On December 31, 1861, he was released and given a certificate of good conduct.

His return to civilian life was short, as he signed a 7-year-old contract on October 14, 1862 and returned to the 2nd regiment. Because of his experience with the cuirassiers, his good service and height of 6 feet (at the time, the average size of men was about 5 foot 5 inches), he entered the very strict recruitment criteria of the prestigious cent-gardes Squadron that he joined on January 20, 1866, and was assigned the number 418.

Consisting exclusively of large, experienced cavalry, the squadron of cent-gardes escorted the emperor Napoleon III on horseback in his public appearances, and assured his and his family's safety in the imperial palaces. Their large size and their brilliant uniforms gave them very high prestige, and one of their peculiarities was to remain in all circumstances impeccably fixed, like statues, which earned them the nickname "caryatids of power". Their immobility was legendary: the young Prince Imperial, still a child, mischievously emptied a box of dragees into the boot of a sentry on watch, who did not flinch. Their unusual build, imposing appearance, and their beautiful uniforms enamored women, and many of them succumbed to the charm of the handsome horsemen:

The reputation of the cent-gardes in this area was of a joking manner: a humorous engraving at the time, published by the Le Bon Marché, was that of a cent-gardes officer, back at his quarters at the end to the Court, busy emptying his boots filled with love letters by admirers while he was standing still.

It seemed that Prévost was particularly noticed for his physique: "He represented the physical beauty and we could've molded the other hundred guards like him.".

At the end of his service, Prévost was released on April 14, 1869 with, for a second time, a certificate of good conduct.

Career and behavior in the police force 

From July 1, 1869, he was hired by the municipal police in Paris on the recommendation of one its leader, Sergeant de Ville, and tenured a year later on June 30, 1870. But the body was soon dissolved on September 10, the day after the fall of the Second Empire. It was almost immediately recreated under another name, and Prévost engaged, on November 8, 1870, as a peacekeeper. He was attached to the post at Rue de l'Évangile, located in Quartier de La Chapelle of the 18th arrondissement of Paris.

If his behavior was irreproachable during his stays in the army, it was not the same when Prévost joined the municipal police. On September 18, 1871, he was reprimanded for negligence in his service. On September 11, 1876, he was blamed for abandoning the block he was supposed to watch, and on the 15th he was subjected to a deduction of salary for spending his time at a wine merchant. However, on April 16, 1876, he was commended for having mastered, at the peril of his life, a runaway horse which earned him a bonus.

Prévost was not easy to converse with: He was nonetheless very helpful, and loved children. Besides his working hours, he happened to escort home stray kids, offering them treats he purchased on the way.

His appearance varied greatly according to his uniform:  His success with the fair sex complicated the life of his boss: Because of this, Prévost was exiled as a monitor in Gare du Nord, where there were only men.

Crimes and punishment

Murder of Alexandre Lenoble 

On September 10, 1879, at about 8 o'clock in the evening, Madame Thiéry, a resident of the district which was deserted at this hour, saw at the corner of the Rue de La Chapelle and Rue du Pré maudit the tall figure of a man, dressed in a cattle driver's gown and a silk cap, leaning over the stream that passed there. Intrigued, she watched him from a distance and ended up seeing him walk away towards Ney Boulevard. Madame Thiéry cautiously approached the place he abandoned and discovered, half stuck in a manhole, a packet containing freshly cut meat. At that moment, a peacekeeper named Hardy came by and she asked him for help. They immediately decided to take the package to the police station, but took the advice of a butcher and a pharmacist, who recognized fragments from a skinned human arm. Research was immediately undertaken and 77 additional pieces were discovered, three of which were recovered from a rag-picker who was about to sell them for consumption. Other parts, including a hand and "the parts of a person who belongs to the male sex" were found in a ditch near the fortifications near the Poterne des Poisonniers. At the Paris morgue, where the pieces were transferred, efforts were made to reconstitute the body of the victim by reassembly, as to when they were discovered, that still remained a secret. In the end, only the head was missing, as well as a piece that could never be found because a poor man had probably "picked up it carefully, packaged it, like a piece of veal falling from the net of a housewife, cooked it in his hut and enjoyed it with the family."

The next morning, Madame Thiéry went to the police station to make a statement. When asked to describe the suspect, she said that she did not know him, but using the light from a street lamp, she found that he bore a resemblance to the well-known peacekeeper in the neighborhood, known under the soubriquet of "The Handsome Man". Madame Thiéry was also convinced that he had been her neighbor on Rue des Roses in 1877. Prévost seemed like an unlikely suspect for Commissioner Lefébure, but he still summoned him in the presence of his accuser. Prévost denied involvement, stating the following: The commissioner immediately responded: Embarrassed, Prévost replied that he was at home due to indisposition. This was another lie, as the day before, at around 21 o'clock, wearing a blouse and carrying a bucket covered with a cloth, he met a colleague to whom he said he was tired because he had just helped a friend move. Overwhelmed, Prévost went silent. When Lefébure asked him where is the head, Prévost replied "at home, in a cauldron". The victim was a certain Lenoble, a jeweler. Accused, Prévost confessed:His guilt being proven, Prévost was first sent to the lock-up before being incarcerated in Mazas Prison to await trial.

Alexandre Lenoble was a 38-year-old jewelry broker who had just recently established his own business. He left behind a widow and two children, aged 11 and 6. The butcher knife used by Prévost to dismember the victim is kept at the Musée de la préfecture de police in Paris.

Murder of Adèle Blondin 

Prévost also had a mistress named Adèle Blondin. She had been for some time the governess of a rich old man who, to thank her, had left her a sum of 30,000 francs. Blondin sometimes helped her impoverished sister but, being economical, she lived on a monthly income of 1,500 francs from its capital placed in state annuity. Blondin bought a business and began earning a few thousand francs worth of money. Being suspicious, she usually hid her values, money and main jewelry. On Sunday, February 27, 1876, she went to lunch at Prévost's house, who at the time lived at 22 Rue de l'Évangile, in front of the police station where he worked. Her landlady saw her leaving, adorned with her jewels and wrapped with a Scottish shawl.

The connection was obvious. The objects, jewels and clothes of the disappeared, especially her Scottish shawl, were found at Prévost's home. At first he had claimed that she had forgotten her umbrella, but took her shawl. When confronted with overwhelming evidence, he began denying the claims, saying that they were gifts from Blondin and that he was mistaken in stating that he had taken her shawl. When brought to his former home on Rue de l'Évangile where Blondin had been seen for the last time, the discovery of blood droplets led Prévost to confess his crime:In the afternoon, Prévost guided the investigators to the place where he buried the head. Quickly, a laborer dug up the fragmented skull of the unfortunate victim.

Suspect in two other disappearances 
In early October, following the discovery of Prévost second murder, a rumor spread of a third possible crime. Prévost is suspected of having previously murdered another peacekeeper, who disappeared without a trace four years before, an act which he categorically denied. To put an end to an inquiry with uncertain results that promised to be long, while the authorities wanted to finish quickly, he was made to write a written statement in which he expressed his repentance for his two confirmed crimes. Prévost swore that if he was guilty of anything, he would confess without hesitation.     

In his work concerning Prévost, Gustave Massé talked about his discussions with Louis-Alphonse Hyrvoix, former chief of Napoleon III's cent-gardes who, as such, watched the guests at the balls, parties and receptions that took place at the Tuileries Palace. Despite the precautions, undesirables and women of "high gallantry" managed to slip in. At the Ball of Tuileries in 1867, Hyrvoix noticed a fair-skinned woman, dressed in a simple but tasteful manner, on the arm of an embassy attaché to whom she asked many questions, while taking notes in a small notebook. Located by police officers who escorted her out of the ball, she was subjected to an interrogation, to which she bowed with good grace: it turned out that the young woman was a 35-year-old rich widow from a good family, who traveled all over Europe, sometimes in male costumes, who sorted all of her travels in a chronicle she addressed to a Parisian newspaper under the pseudonym "Furet". She had persuaded her lover to giver her the means to enter the palace, which she had wanted to visit. As a result, the young embassy attaché had to resign from his post. Supervised by the imperial police, it was established that the woman was free of many manners: she had had multiple adventures with handsome men, who to her were only tools for pleasure. Thus, it was discovered that she regularly invited Prévost over in a private office, located in a restaurant on the avenue de Neuilly. A short time later, the lady disappeared without a trace and was never seen or heard from again. The evening of her disappearance, she had had supper with Victor Prévost.

At that time, nobody cared: the lady was an adventuress, as frivolous as she was unpredictable, who traveled a lot. As no complaint for her disappearance was filed for a while, the handsome cent-gardes, petticoat rider but with an irreproachable behavior, had no reason to be suspected. It was only at the time of his arrest and the revelation of his two killings that the few people still aware of the strange disappearance, then 12 years old, made the connection with a possible additional murder. But investigators, who weren't aware of the suspicious against Prévost prior to his trial and that the possible crime, being impossible to prove, was prescribed to him anyway.

A few minutes before his execution, when Prévost was asked for the last time if he had anything else to say, he replied: "I confessed to the two crimes I committed. That's enough, unfortunately. I did not make other mistakes in my life...".

Gold or silver?

Prévost did not disdain the money taken from his victims, but at the same time, he did not seek wealth or even an easier lifestyle. The opinion of his colleagues and friend Doré was unambigious: "Prévost had only one word to say: to swim in opulence. He was a lady's man. He frequented around very rich people who would have been happy to sacrifice their fortune to him, but if he accepted attendance at diners and parties, he rejected money and gifts. He would see himself as dishonored by accepting them. You should have seen the indignant air with which he exclaimed 'Do they take me for a barbel?'" At the moment when he murdered Alexandre Lenoble for some gold jewelry, and him being a demimonde, who was very much in the mood for a castle in the provinces. He had nagged Prévost about his modest home, while Lenoble had a splendid carriage and was covered in diamonds, whose value far exceeded that of Prévost.

On the other hand, Prévost was fascinated by gold, with a particular interest for precious watches that his means did not allow him to possess.

Trial 
Victor Prévost's trial was held before the cour d'assises in Seine, chaired by Mr. Hardouin and two assessors, on December 7, 1879. At quarter past eleven, the accused entered, accompanied by eight guards. The defence was provided by Mr. Bouchot, while the Attorney General was Mr. Lefebvre de Biefville. While reading through the indictment, which included details and the way in which the two murders were committed, Prévost stood upright and remained calm, but his discouragement could be felt. He then answered questions from the judge, who made him confirm the facts and clarify details. It was then when the witnesses were called, confirming the depositions made during the instruction. Then following the indictment, during which Prévost seemed to accuse the police of a cover-up, and pleaded to his lawyer.

After a summary of the debates by the judge, the jury met to deliberate and answer all the questions posed in just twenty minutes. The court then withdrew to establish their verdict before pronouncing, unsurprisingly, the death sentence against Victor Prévost for crimes of premeditated murder. During the statement, he showed no emotion.

Execution 

The day after his trial, on December 9 in the afternoon, Prévost was transferred to the La Roquette Grand Prison, a unique detention center in which death row inmates were executed since 1851. On December 13, he was visited by Father Crozes, the prison almoner and, from that moment, he showed an interest in pracitising religion. The next day he asked to attend mass and, on the following January 11, he expressed to the abbot his wish to make his First Communion which he hadn't received in his childhood, a sacrament which he received on January 16 at 7 o'clock in the morning, in the prison chapel. On the evening of the ceremony, he wrote a last letter to his brother Adolphe, in which he acknowledged his errors, expressed his desire for repentance and demanded "a thousand pardons".

On December 26, 1879, an appeal was dismissed by the Criminal Division of the cour d'assises. The next day, his lawyer made him sign a petition for a pardon. The then-president, Jules Grévy, generally wasn't very reluctant to grant pardons to those sentenced to death, but followed the recommendations of the commissions of pardons, which concluded that justice must follow its course because of the particularly sordid crimes and Prévost's profession. Grévy justified his decision to the condemned lawyer in the following letter: The pardon was formally rejected on January 18, and Louis Deibler, recently appointed chief executioner on May 15, was summoned to the prosecutor's office of the Republic and issued the ultimate requisition: Order is given to the chief executioner of criminal judgments to seize Victor Prévost, sentenced to death by the cour d'assises of Seine, on December 8, 1879, and proceed with his execution in public on Monday, January 19, 1880, at seven o'clock in the morning.

On the scheduled date and time, Prévost was executed publicly in front of the prison, in the freezing cold (-5 °C). It had previously snowed, and two huge snow mounds surrounded the square, plunging into near darkness. Since six o'clock in the morning, a hundred republican guards, fifty horsemen, and three hundred peacekeepers had taken their places to keep at a distance those who had come to watch the execution. Warned that his execution would take place at 6:30, Prévost was asked to put on a white shirt, which he refused, and to keep his slippers on, because the boots would hurt his feet. He obeyed all the preparatory procedures for implementation, and walked worthily to the scaffold. Between his identification and his execution, it took a little more than four months.

As for the executioner Louis Deibler, that was his first execution in Paris, as he had previously practised his job in the provinces. For this first time, he was to be assisted by his first deputy designate, Alphonse-Léon Berger (later chief executioner of Corsica, 1870-1875), who was dismissed from Prévost's execution, which caused a lasting quarrel between the two men.

Autopsy and scientific studies 

Prévost's family did not claim his body, so he was put at the disposal of the dean for the Faculty of Forensic Medicine, for the purpose of an autopsy and phrenological studies.

However, legal procedures required a mock burial in the cemetery. Immediately after the execution, the coffin containing Prévost's body and head was loaded with a bran container into a van that went off on the field with a great trot, escorted by mounted gendarmes, to go to the hospice cemeteries which adjoined Ivry Cemetery. It was followed by three cars, carrying the chaplain, accompanied by the head of the security services and the journalists. At precisely 7:45, the van stopped near an open pit surrounded by gravediggers. Prévost's body was exhumed from the coffin, placed in a light wooden coffin, with his head slipped between his legs. Father Crozes recited a final prayer before the coffin was temporarily closed with two nails. Ultimately, the pit become bloodied, which came from the bottom of the coffin. At the end of the brief ceremony, the coffin was loaded into a medical van, which immediately left towards the medical faculty.

At half-past eight, only an hour and a half after his execution, Prévost's still-warm body was disposed of in Professor Charles-Philippe Robin's laboratory at the Practical School in the Faculty of Medicine in Paris. Immediately, the teacher, the doctors and the students engaged in various experiments. At 10 o'clock, with the arrival of a dozen other doctors, there were excitations of the muscles with the help of an electric battery. The sensitivity of the body decreasing, the reactions to shocks was tested. These macabre experiments completed, the fifteen or so experimentalists of all ages began to dissect and dismember the remains of the deceased. "All these observers seem happy at the opportunity to study at leisure, under the microscope, studies on the body of a man who, a few hours earlier, was in good health. [...] At noon, there remained of the old body only packets of crumbling flesh, emptied of blood, shapeless and scattered.".

Shortly after, Professor Paul Broca published a study entitled "The Brain of the Killer Prévost". From his analysis, with assorted scholarly considerations, Prévost as put in the category of "smart murderers", but functional defects in the brain made it "very abnormal". Another scholar, Louis Bélières, resumed this study in 1909 by comparing Prévost's brain to those of other criminals.

Bulimia 
From a very young age, Victor Prévost suffered from insatiable bulimia, inherited from his father, which manifested itself throughout his life: "I have a good appetite, I eat well; but do not gain weight.", he wrote in prison. The autopsy notes anomalies present on his digestive prison that could perhaps have a link with his perpetual munching, but no study was conducted beyond simple observations. During a banquet organized by the Friendly Association of the Ancient Cent-Gardes, Brigadier Valentin recounted having surprised Prévost, while he was stealing from the squadron's raw meat supplies. Several of his ex-comrades confirmed that he had declared: "to the human appetite".

In popular culture 
A certain expression came from his lips: "Cut the cabèche, that's velvet, with chocolate." At the time, the expression circulated in police stations without gaining much mainstream attention, but it was entered into popular language and even taken up by Oscar Méténier in Act II of his macabre drama Lui!, played for the first time on September 11, 1897 at the Grand Guignol Theatre: "Ah!...Cut someone's head! That's velvet!...That's chocolate!".

See also
 List of French serial killers

Notes and references

Notes

References

See also

Mediagraphy

Bibliography

Works 
 Dossier personnel de Victor Prévost (26 712) conservé aux archives de la préfecture de police au Pré Saint-Gervais.
 
  Recueillis de différents côtés et mis en ordre par l’abbé Moreau successeur de l’abbé Crozes ancien aumônier de la Roquette.
  L'auteur a été chef de la sûreté de la préfecture de police du 15 février 1879 au 23 février 1884.
 
 
  Ancien commissaire de police.

Newspaper and periodicals 
 
 
 
 
 
 
  Déroulement du procès et commentaires d'un journaliste présent à l'audience.
 
  Gravure de l'exécution de Prévost sur la double page intérieure.

Radio broadcasts

Related articles 
 Cent-gardes Squadron

External links 
 
 

1836 births
1876 murders in France
1879 murders in France
1880 deaths
19th-century executions by France
French people convicted of murder
People executed by France by guillotine
People from Seine-et-Marne
Suspected serial killers